Lozotaenia edwardi is a species of moth of the family Tortricidae. It is found in North Korea and Primorsky Krai in the Russian Far East.

References

	

Moths described in 1999
Archipini